Craugastor bocourti (common name: Bocourt's robber frog) is a species of frog in the family Craugastoridae. It is endemic to Guatemala and found on the mountains of the Alta Verapaz Department and the Sierra de las Minas. It is named after Marie Firmin Bocourt, a French zoologist and artist.

Its natural habitat is cloud forest where it lives on the forest floor. Craugastor bocourti is threatened by habitat loss caused by agriculture, wood extraction, and human settlement.

References

bocourti
Endemic fauna of Guatemala
Amphibians of Guatemala
Amphibians described in 1877
Taxa named by Paul Brocchi
Taxonomy articles created by Polbot